Jonathan Liss Ohayon (born January 10, 1972 in Toronto, Ontario) is an athlete from Canada, a glass artist, works in the IT field, and is the grandson of writer Joseph Liss. He competes in archery.

Ohayon competed all around the world in archery, was ranked top 30 in the world, won double gold at the Pan American Championships (Individual and Team), and competed at the 2004 Summer Olympics in men's individual archery.

References
Jonathan Ohayon's profile at the Canadian Olympic Committee
sports-reference

1972 births
Living people
Archers at the 2004 Summer Olympics
Canadian people of Moroccan-Jewish descent
Jewish Canadian sportspeople
20th-century Moroccan Jews
Olympic archers of Canada
Sportspeople from Toronto
Canadian male archers